Carex hassei is a species of sedge known by the common name salt sedge. It is native to western North America from British Columbia to Baja California to New Mexico, where it grows in moist places, such as meadows.

Description
This sedge, Carex hassei, is similar to the Golden sedge, Carex aurea, and has sometimes been treated as part of that species. It produces stems up to about 40 centimeters tall, or sometimes taller. The inflorescence has a long, leaflike bract that is longer than the spikes. The flowers have reddish-brown, white-tipped scales and the fruit is coated in a perigynium which is fleshy, bumpy, and light in color.

External links
Jepson Manual Treatment - Carex hassei
USDA Plants Profile
Flora of North America
Carex hassei - Photo gallery

hassei
Flora of the Western United States
Flora of the Sierra Nevada (United States)
Flora of the West Coast of the United States
Flora of British Columbia
Flora of California
Flora of Baja California
Plants described in 1896
Flora without expected TNC conservation status